Ad Noiseam is an independent record label that has from 2001 onwards published electronic music in the form of (breakcore, drum'n'bass, IDM, dubstep) as well as hip-hop and jazz based in Berlin, Germany. Ad Noiseam was founded in April of 2001 by Nicolas Chevreux, who also has done some of the design work for the label's releases. Ad Noiseam originally started out as a webzine but quickly moved on to being a record-label establishing a name for itself with its first release "Krach Test" (adn 01), a true tour-de-force 3CDr set featuring anyone who was anyone in the 2001 electronic music scene. After releasing high quality, small batch (mini)-CDr releases, the label phased out the CDr's in favour of factory pressed CDs with 2001's "Subfusc" by Tarmvred, after which numerous releases on both vinyl and CD followed. Continuing its forward vision music- and designwise, Ad Noiseam built a huge following of music enthusiasts as well as musicians.

On top of the label activities, Ad Noiseam is also a mailorder and a distribution channel for both in-house and other labels' releases. Since 2001, Ad Noiseam has spread CDs and records to end customers, stores and other mailorders worldwide.

In 2011, Ad Noiseam celebrated its 10th anniversary with a festival held at the Berghain club, followed by a series of birthday concerts in more than 10 European countries. As of July 2016 the label is in a state of "deep freeze".

Roster
Ad Noiseam has released music by the following artists:

See also
 Breakcore
 Dubstep
 Maschinenfest
 Power noise
 List of record labels

References

External links
 Official site
 Ad Noiseam on Twitter
 Ad Noiseam on Facebook
  - Interview with Nicolas Chevreux about Ad Noiseam
 Interview with Ad Noiseam artist Hecq
 Ad Noiseam discography on Discogs

Electronic music record labels
German independent record labels
Record labels established in 2001
Industrial record labels
Noise music record labels